This list of nonreligious Nobel laureates comprises laureates of the Nobel Prize who have self-identified as atheist, agnostic, freethinker, or otherwise nonreligious at some point in their lives.

Many of these laureates earlier identified with a religion. In an estimate by Baruch Shalev, between 1901 and 2000, about 10.5% of all laureates, and 35% of those in literature, fall in this category. According to the same estimate, between 1901 and 2000, atheists, agnostics, and freethinkers won 8.9% of the prizes in  medicine, 7.1% in chemistry, 5.2% in economics, 4.7% in physics, and 3.6% in peace. Alfred Nobel himself was an atheist later in life.

Shalev's book lists many Jewish atheists, agnostics, and freethinkers as religiously Jewish. For example, Milton Friedman, Roald Hoffmann, Richard Feynman, Niels Bohr, Élie Metchnikoff, and Rita Levi-Montalcini are listed as religiously Jewish; however, while they were ethnically and perhaps culturally Jewish, they did not believe in a God and self-identified as atheists.

Physics

Chemistry

Physiology or Medicine

Economics

Peace

Literature

See also 
 List of Christian Nobel laureates
 List of Jewish Nobel laureates
 List of Muslim Nobel laureates
 List of Nobel laureates

Notes

References 

-Secular